Felipe Reinaldo da Silva  (born April 17, 1978) is a Brazilian football striker who plays for Passo Fundo.

Club career
Felipe previously played for Vitória and Náutico in the Campeonato Brasileiro Série A.

He scored twice in the opening of Brasileirao 2009 against his former club Nautico, the match ended 3-3.

Honours
Top scorer Campeonato Gaúcho: 2
 2000, 2005

References

 CBF 

1978 births
Living people
Brazilian footballers
Clube Náutico Capibaribe players
Esporte Clube Vitória players
Goiás Esporte Clube players
Atlético Clube Goianiense players
América Futebol Clube (MG) players
Ituano FC players
Figueirense FC players
Sociedade Esportiva e Recreativa Caxias do Sul players
América Futebol Clube (SP) players
Joinville Esporte Clube players
Campeonato Brasileiro Série A players
Association football forwards